Jinotepe is a city and municipality in the Carazo department of Nicaragua.

It borders with Managua, Masaya, Granada, and Rivas.

Toponymy
Jinotepe comes from the náhuatl "xilotl" (“tender corn”), "tepetl" (“hill”) y "-k" (“place”). Jinotepe means "the place of the tender corn".

Geography

Climate
Under Köppen’s climate classification, the city has a tropical wet and dry climate. A distinct dry season exists between November and April, while most of the rainfall is received between May and October. Temperatures are highest in March and April, when the sun lies directly overhead and the summer rainfall has yet to begin.

Sports
Home of the baseball team cafeteros de carazo.

International relations

Twin towns – Sister cities
Jinotepe is twinned with:

References

Municipalities of the Carazo Department